Monument to the Masses is the second album by Ima Robot.  It was released by Virgin Records in 2006.

Track listing
All tracks written by Alex Ebert. 
"Disconnect" - 03:31
"Creeps Me Out" - 03:03
"Cool, Cool Universe" - 03:15
"The Beat" - 03:37
"Eskimo Ride" - 02:59
"Chip Off the Block" - 04:41
"Happy Annie" - 04:11
"Pouring Pain" - 03:27
"Stick It to the Man" - 03:02
"What Comes Tomorrow?" - 02:36
"Lovers in Captivity" - 05:04
"Dangerous Life" - 03:28

2006 albums
Ima Robot albums
Virgin Records albums